Emily Hood Westacott (née Hood; 6 May 1910– 9 October 1980), was an Australian female tennis player in the 1930s.

In 1930 she won the national junior singles and doubles titles as well as the doubles title with Margaret Molesworth. Due to illness she played little tennis in 1935 and the first half of 1936.

She won the Australian Championship singles in 1939, defeating Nell Hopman in straight sets. In 1937 she was a finalist losing in the final to Nancye Wynne Bolton in three sets. Together with Margaret Molesworth, she won three women's doubles titles at the Australian Championships in 1930, 1933, and 1934.

In 1939 the Queensland Lawn Tennis Association proposed to send Westacott and May Hardcastle to the Wimbledon Championships, but Westacott declined due to illness of her mother.

She married Victor Clyde Westacott on 20 August 1930 at the Methodist Church in Brisbane.

Grand Slam finals

Singles: 2 (1 titles, 1 runner-up)

Doubles: 5 (3 titles, 2 runners-up)

Mixed doubles: 2 (2 runners-up)

References 

1910 births
1980 deaths
Australian Championships (tennis) champions
Australian female tennis players
Tennis players from Brisbane
Grand Slam (tennis) champions in women's singles
Grand Slam (tennis) champions in women's doubles
Grand Slam (tennis) champions in girls' singles
Australian Championships (tennis) junior champions
Sportswomen from Queensland